In the 1890s, an epizootic of the rinderpest virus struck Africa, considered to be "the most devastating epidemic to hit southern Africa in the late nineteenth century". It killed more than 5.2 million cattle south of the Zambezi, as well as domestic oxen, sheep, and goats, and wild populations of buffalo, giraffe, and wildebeest. This led to starvation resulting in the death of an estimated third of the human population of Ethiopia and two-thirds of the Maasai people of Tanzania.

The famine significantly depopulated sub-Saharan Africa, allowing thornbush to colonise. This formed ideal habitat for tsetse fly, which carries sleeping sickness, and is unsuitable for livestock.

The virus is thought to have been introduced into Eritrea in 1887 by Indian cattle brought by the Italians for their campaign against Somalia. It spread throughout the Horn of Africa, and crossed the Zambezi in March 1896.

Sir Arnold Theiler was instrumental in developing a vaccine that curbed the epizootic.

References

Further reading

Famines in Africa
1890s in Africa
1890s in Ethiopia
19th-century famines